The William Curtis House is a historic house located at 2330 Washington Street in the Newton Lower Falls village of Newton, Massachusetts.

Description and history 
This -story wood-frame house was built in 1839 for William Curtis, and is an important local example of transitional Federal-Greek Revival styling. It has Federal massing, with a five bay front facade and four side chimneys, but it has Greek Revival corner pilasters, and a front entry sheltered by a Doric porch. William Curtis and his brother owned a local paper mill, which was the first in the area to install a Foudrinier machine, enabling the production of paper on rolls.

The house was listed on the National Register of Historic Places on September 4, 1986.

See also
 National Register of Historic Places listings in Newton, Massachusetts

References

Houses on the National Register of Historic Places in Newton, Massachusetts
Houses completed in 1839
Greek Revival architecture in Massachusetts